Min Nae Mha Chit Tat Pyi is a 2002 romantic-drama film, directed by Khin Maung Oo & Soe Thein Htut starring Dwe, Eaindra Kyaw Zin, Nay Aung and Thu Maung.

Cast
Dwe as Nyo Chaw
Eaindra Kyaw Zin as Myo Myo, Myo Myint Myint Myat
Nay Aung as U Myint Myat
Thu Maung as U Lu Hla
Wyne as Aung Lwin Oo
Kutho as Bodyguard 1
Kin Kaung as Bodyguard 2
Phoe Phyu as Bodyguard 3
Nga Pyaw Kyaw as Bodyguard 4
Hnin Si as Mother of Nyo Chaw
Gone Pone as Nyo Seint
Zu Zu Maung as Phyu Lone

References

2002 films
2000s Burmese-language films
Burmese romantic drama films
Films shot in Myanmar
2002 romantic drama films